Bandits of Dark Canyon is a 1947 American Western film directed by Philip Ford, written by Robert Creighton Williams, starring Allan Lane and released on December 15 by Republic Pictures.

Plot

Cast   
Allan Lane as Rocky Lane 
Black Jack as Black Jack, Lane's horse
Bob Steele as Ed Archer
Eddy Waller as Nugget
Roy Barcroft as Jeff Conley
John Hamilton as Ben Shaw
Linda Leighton as Joan Shaw 
Gregory Marshall as Billy Archer
Francis Ford as Horse Trader
Eddie Acuff as Stage Passenger Faraday
LeRoy Mason as Archer's Guard
Norman Willis as Sheriff

References

External links 
 

1947 films
American Western (genre) films
1947 Western (genre) films
Republic Pictures films
Films directed by Philip Ford
American black-and-white films
1940s English-language films
1940s American films